Demircili (ancient Imbriogon) is a village in Silifke district of Mersin Province, Turkey. It is situated on the southern slopes of the Taurus Mountains. The population of Demircili is 343 as of 2011. There are Roman ruins, some of which are situated along the road to the north, mostly mausoleums of wealthy Roman citizens of Seleucia who had summer residences in Demircili (then Imbriogon), as many Silifke residents still do today. The main economic activity is agriculture. Olives and pistachios are the most pronounced crops.

References

Villages in Silifke District